Leucettusa soyo is a species of calcareous sponge in the family Leucaltidae  found in Japan.

References

World Register of Marine Species entry

Invertebrates of Japan
Animals described in 1933